Falkenhayn and von Falkenhayn may refer to:

 Benita von Falkenhayn (1900–1935), a Swiss-born German baroness who was a spy for Poland 
 Erich von Falkenhayn (1861–1922), Chief of the German general staff 1914–1916.
 Eugen von Falkenhayn (1853–1934), German General of the Cavalry